North Carolina Highway 184 (NC 184) is a primary state highway in the U.S. state of North Carolina. It runs from NC 105 at Tynecastle (Sugar Mountain) to the town of Beech Mountain.

Route description

Serving as a spur of NC 105, NC 184 allows easy connection from Boone or Linville to Banner Elk and golf/ski resorts at Sugar and Beech mountains. Congestion is common, which peaks in early autumn (fall colors) and winter holidays. The highway crosses the Eastern Continental Divide just north of Tynecastle, but is unmarked.

The final part of the highway, from the stoplight in Banner Elk to the Town Hall on Beech Mountain, served as a major finish in the Tour DuPont Bike Race during the 1990s. Lance Armstrong also made his return to biking after cancer on NC 184 up Beech Mountain.

History
In 1937, NC 184 was originally established as a spur of NC 18 to Boiling Springs. In 1940, it was renumbered as part of NC 150.

The current NC 184 was established in 1956 as a new primary routing, connecting NC 105 to NC 194 in Banner Elk. In 1981, NC 184 was extended through Banner Elk, with brief overlap with NC 194, then continuing along Beech Mountain Parkway to the town of Beech Mountain; ending  after crossing into Watauga County.

Junction list

References

External links

 NCRoads.com: N.C. 184

Transportation in Avery County, North Carolina
Transportation in Watauga County, North Carolina
184